Radio Romántica was a name used by EXCL Communications (later Entravision) for various Spanish-language radio stations from the 1990s through 2005. The earliest known reference to Radio Romántica is from 1997, at the time when EXCL moved KBRG 104.9 to 100.3 San Jose during a frequency swap deal from American Radio Systems. Later EXCL's Radio Romántica Spanish AC format was adapted to KJMN Denver, KRZY-FM Albuquerque, an unknown Salinas station, and another unknown station were using the name.

Entravision acquired the Radio Romántica name and stations following its purchase of EXCL Communications in 2000. The name was subsequently used on several of Entravision's other stations, including KLOB Palm Springs, KRRE Sacramento, KCVR Modesto, KVVA/KDVA Phoenix, and KRVA Dallas. In 2003, Entravision began phasing out the Radio Romántica format in favor of Super Estrella. Edgar Pineda who was the Program Director between March 2001 and December 2004 also made the transition to Super Estrella leaving only KBRG under Radio Romántica format and under the Aracelys Rivera's Direction. By the end of 2005, KBRG was the only station still using the Radio Romántica name.

Some of the Announcers that were part of Radio Romántica are Aracelys Rivera, Pedro Biaggi, Carlos Hernández, Paul Camacho, Juan Fernando, Carlos Rivera, Jorge Cardona, and Ricardo Rendon. 

Radio Romántica ceased to exist on January 1, 2006, when KBRG was acquired by Univision and switched to Spanish oldies as Recuerdo 100.3. Coincidentally, KBRG's original frequency, 104.9 (used before 1998), flipped to Spanish at the same time that 100.3 became Recuerdo. KCNL 104.9, owned by Clear Channel, briefly renamed itself La Romántica 104.9 before it assumed its current name, Enamorada 104.9, in February 2006.

References

Spanish-language radio in the United States
Defunct radio networks in the United States

Radio stations disestablished in 2006